Sandals Church is a Baptist multi-site church based in Riverside, California. It is affiliated with the Southern Baptist Convention.

History
It was founded by Pastor Matt Brown and his wife, Tammy, in 1997.

For the first 13 years of its existence, Sandals Church met in various locations throughout Riverside, CA, the longest of which was at the gym at California Baptist University. In 2010, Sandals Church purchased and moved to its own property at 150 Palmyrita Avenue in Riverside. In 2012, Sandals Church launched its second campus in the Woodcrest area of Riverside. Sandals Church has campuses in Moreno Valley, East Valley, Hunter Park, Downtown Riverside (Palm Ave Campus), San Bernardino, Banning, Woodcrest, Lake Arrowhead, Menifee, Eastvale, and Fresno 

In 2014, it has an average weekly attendance of over 5,799.

Other information

Heather Veitch, a former stripper, was attending Sandals Church’s when it founded JC's Girls with the help of Matt White.

References

 

Evangelical megachurches in the United States
Megachurches in California
Buildings and structures in Riverside, California
Churches in Riverside County, California
Evangelical churches in California
2001 establishments in California
Christian organizations established in 2001
Organizations based in Riverside, California
Southern Baptist Convention churches
Baptist multisite churches
Baptist churches in California